Maoricolpus, common name the "New Zealand screw shells", is a genus of sea snails, marine gastropod molluscs in the family Turritellidae, the Turritella snails. 

This genus is found in New Zealand and Australia.

Species and subspecies
Species and subspecies in the genus Maoricolpus include:
 † Maoricolpus doni Marwick, 1971 
 Maoricolpus finlayi Powell, 1940
 † Maoricolpus horni Marwick, 1971 
 † Maoricolpus ongleyi Marwick, 1931 
 Maoricolpus roseus (Quoy and Gaimard, 1834)
 Subspecies Maoricolpus roseus manukauensis Powell, 1931
 † Maoricolpus solomoni (Marwick, 1928) 
 † Maoricolpus waitemataensis (Powell & Bartrum, 1929) 
Species brought into synonymy
 † Maoricolpus proroseus Marwick, 1931: synonym of Maoricolpus roseus (Quoy & Gaimard, 1834)

References

 Powell A. W. B., New Zealand Mollusca, William Collins Publishers Ltd, Auckland, New Zealand 1979

External links
 New Zealand molluscs
 Finlay H.J. (1926). A further commentary on New Zealand molluscan systematics. Transactions of the New Zealand Institute. 57: 320-485, pls 18-23

Turritellidae
Taxa named by Harold John Finlay